Paula Simons (born September 7, 1964) is a Canadian senator. She previously worked as a journalist and was a columnist for the Edmonton Journal in Edmonton, Alberta. She sits as a senator representing Alberta in the Senate of Canada, and is part of the Independent Senators Group caucus.

Early life and career 
Simons was born and raised in Edmonton, Alberta, one of two children born to Norman Wolfe and Oli (née Dyck) Simons. Her father, a lawyer, was of Jewish descent; her paternal grandparents had immigrated from Russia and settled in Round Hill, Alberta where he was raised. She earned a B.A. Honours degree in English Literature and minor in French and Comparative Literature from the University of Alberta in 1986, and a master's degree in Journalism from Stanford University, before spending time as a fellow at the Poynter Institute for Media Studies. She returned to Canada in the winter of 1988 and secured a position as a part-time weekend copy editor at the Alberta Report, then as a producer for CBC Radio in Toronto and Edmonton from 1989 to 1995.

Edmonton JournalJoining in 1995, Simons is best known for her work as a journalist with the Edmonton Journal newspaper, where her work as a political columnist and investigative journalist earned her a faithful following. She became a columnist on city affairs in 2001.

Over the course of her 23 years with the Journal, Simons earned two National Newspaper Awards for her investigations and analysis of Alberta's troubled child welfare system. Her investigative work on Indigenous child welfare and government cover-ups of the deaths of children in foster care also earned her recognition from the UNESCO Canadian Committee for World Press Freedom, and from Journalists for Human Rights.

Simons was part of two Edmonton Journal “breaking news” teams that won National Newspaper Awards for their coverage of the Fort McMurray wildfire and for their stories on the murder of four RCMP officers at Rochfort Bridge, Alberta. She earned a six further National Newspaper Award citations of merit for her columns and editorials on Alberta politics.

She has also received recognition from the Alberta Centre for Civil Liberties Research for her work championing LGBQT rights, from the Canadian Bar Association for her writing on legal affairs, from the Canadian Mental Health Association for her columns on mental health care, and from the Edmonton Historical Board for her work as a popular historian and champion of heritage preservation.

2015 Alberta general election 
Simons disclosed in the final days of the run-up to the 2015 Alberta Provincial Election that the editorial board of the Edmonton Journal had been under pressure from the paper's parent company Post Media, and namely its CEO Paul Godfrey, to endorse the incumbent Progressive Conservative Party of Alberta and its leader Jim Prentice. While their Alberta coverage was deemed to have "reported quite fairly during the election", Post Media was strongly criticized by Simons and many of her fellow journalists (and some of the public) for presenting the Journal as a neutral, local source without partisan bias when in fact they were facing pressure to advocate for one specific candidate. Traditionally, newspapers are expected to disclose their bias through an endorsement, as The Journal did in the 2019 Alberta election when they endorsed the UCP candidate Jason Kenney.

Senate of Canada 
Paula Simons was appointed to the Senate of Canada (upper chamber) on October 3, 2018 by her Excellency the Rt. Hon. Julie Payette, Gov-Gen. of Canada on behalf of Her Majesty the Queen of Canada, Elizabeth II, on the recommendation of Prime Minister Justin Trudeau.

In a column Simons wrote about the Senate published August 13, 2013, she discussed how and why Senators get appointed, their entitlement, and some of her current colleagues "allegedly bending the rules" in the Senate. "These days, the Senate is failing on almost every front. Instead of being appointed on merit, all too often senators get the gig because they're political cronies or party loyalists, bagmen (and women) who have primarily distinguished themselves as rabid partisans or backroom boys, not deep thinkers." Referring to her reinstated colleagues she said, "Small wonder many Canadians are wondering why we bother at all with an unelected upper house, full of entitled toffs who can't be turfed even if they break the law, even if they're not medically competent to hold office," she wrote. "Yes, there are earnest, hardworking, intelligent, thoughtful senators serving on committees, scrutinizing legislation, meeting with school kids, speaking to service clubs. But they've been so overshadowed in the public mind by the antics of the reprobates that it's hard for any senator to maintain public credibility."

References

1964 births
Living people
Canadian women journalists
Canadian senators from Alberta
Independent Canadian senators
Journalists from Alberta
Politicians from Edmonton
Women members of the Senate of Canada
Women in Alberta politics
Canadian newspaper journalists
Canadian investigative journalists
Canadian columnists
Canadian women columnists